is a platform game for the Nintendo Entertainment System, developed and published by Atlus. The game is based on the Hanna-Barbera cartoon Wacky Races and features Muttley and Dick Dastardly as the main characters.

An unrelated Amiga and Atari ST game of the same name was released in 1991 and a racing game of the same name came out in 2000.

Gameplay
The player controls Muttley through three different areas (Hip Hop, Splish Splash and Go Go America) which can be selected from a map screen, and all three must be completed to reach the game's ending. The first two areas have three stages each, while Go Go America has four. The player can jump and initially use a short-ranged bite attack, but by collecting bones, the player can swap them in a fashion reminiscent of the Gradius series for a bomb attack, a flying "bark shot", the ability to glide with Muttley's tail, and extra health. Each of the ten stages ends in a boss battle against one of the other ten racers. Defeating one will clear the current stage and defeating all three/four in that area will allow progression to the next area.

The game features a rendition of the theme song from the Japanese dub of the TV series as the title screen music.

References

Atlus games
Nintendo Entertainment System games
Nintendo Entertainment System-only games
Platform games
Video games based on Hanna-Barbera series and characters
Video games developed in Japan
Video games based on Wacky Races
Cartoon Network video games
Single-player video games